Pista Automóvel de Montalegre is a motorsport race track situated in the municipality of Montalegre, in the Vila Real District of Portugal, close to the Spanish border. It primarily runs the Portuguese round of the European and World Rallycross championships, having hosted the latter from 2014 to 2018 and again since 2021. Before the 2022 World RX of Portugal, the layout was revised and lengthened.

References

External links

Motorsport venues in Portugal
World Rallycross circuits